The Quest of the Philosopher's Stone is a 1986 Canadian board game published by Questone Marketing Inc. The game challenges players with three difficulty levels of puzzles and is set in a medieval fantasy world that includes sites such as Camelot, Atlantis and Stonehenge.

References

Board games introduced in 1986
Canadian board games